Most file systems include attributes of files and directories that control the ability of users to read, change, navigate, and execute the contents of the file system. In some cases, menu options or functions may be made visible or hidden depending on a user's permission level; this kind of user interface is referred to as permission-driven.

Two types of permissions are widely available: POSIX file system permissions and access-control lists (ACLs) which are capable of more specific control.

File system variations

The original File Allocation Table file system has a per-file all-user read-only attribute. 

NTFS implemented in Microsoft Windows NT and its derivatives, use ACLs to provide a complex set of permissions. 

OpenVMS uses a permission scheme similar to that of Unix. There are four categories (system, owner, group, and world) and four types of access permissions (Read, Write, Execute and Delete). The categories are not mutually disjoint: World includes Group, which in turn includes Owner. The System category independently includes system users.

HFS, and its successor HFS+, implemented in the Classic Mac OS operating systems, do not support permissions.

macOS uses POSIX-compliant permissions. Beginning with version 10.4 ("Tiger"), it also supports the use of NFSv4 ACLs in addition to POSIX-compliant permissions. The Apple Mac OS X Server version 10.4+ File Services Administration Manual recommends using only traditional Unix permissions if possible. macOS also still supports the Classic Mac OS's "Protected" attribute.

Solaris ACL support depends on the filesystem being used; older UFS filesystem supports POSIX.1e ACLs, while ZFS supports only NFSv4 ACLs.

Linux supports ext2, ext3, ext4, Btrfs and other file systems many of which include POSIX.1e ACLs. There is experimental support for NFSv4 ACLs for ext3 and ext4 filesystems.

FreeBSD supports POSIX.1e ACLs on UFS, and NFSv4 ACLs on UFS and ZFS.

IBM z/OS implements file security using RACF (Resource Access Control Facility)

The AmigaOS Filesystem, AmigaDOS supports a permissions system relatively advanced for a single-user OS. In AmigaOS 1.x, files had Archive, Read, Write, Execute and Delete (collectively known as ARWED) permissions/flags. In AmigaOS 2.x and higher, additional Hold, Script, and Pure permissions/flags were added.

POSIX permissions

Permissions on Unix-like file systems are defined in the POSIX.1-2017 standard, which uses three scopes or classes known as user, group, and others. When a file is created its permissions are restricted by the umask of the process that created it.

Classes
Files and directories are owned by a user. The owner determines the file's user class. Distinct permissions apply to the owner.

Files and directories are assigned a group, which define the file's group class. Distinct permissions apply to members of the file's group. The owner may be a member of the file's group.

Users who are not the owner, nor a member of the group, comprise a file's others class. Distinct permissions apply to others.

The effective permissions are determined based on the first class the user falls within in the order of user, group then others. For example, the user who is the owner of the file will have the permissions given to the user class regardless of the permissions assigned to the group class or others class.

Permissions
Unix-like systems implement three specific permissions that apply to each class:
 The read permission grants the ability to read a file. When set for a directory, this permission grants the ability to read the names of files in the directory, but not to find out any further information about them such as contents, file type, size, ownership, permissions.
 The write permission grants the ability to modify a file. When set for a directory, this permission grants the ability to modify entries in the directory, which includes creating files, deleting files, and renaming files. Note that this requires that execute is also set; without it, the write permission is meaningless for directories.
 The execute permission grants the ability to execute a file. This permission must be set for executable programs, in order to allow the operating system to run them. When set for a directory, the execute permission is interpreted as the search permission: it grants the ability to access file contents and meta-information if its name is known, but not list files inside the directory, unless read is set also.

The effect of setting the permissions on a directory, rather than a file, is "one of the most frequently misunderstood file permission issues".

When a permission is not set, the corresponding rights are denied. Unlike ACL-based systems, permissions on Unix-like systems are not inherited. Files created within a directory do not necessarily have the same permissions as that directory.

Changing permission behavior with setuid, setgid, and sticky bits
Unix-like systems typically employ three additional modes. These are actually attributes but are referred to as permissions or modes.  These special modes are for a file or directory overall, not by a class, though in the symbolic notation (see below) the setuid bit is set in the triad for the user, the setgid bit is set in the triad for the group and the sticky bit is set in the triad for others.
 The set user ID, setuid, or SUID mode. When a file with setuid is executed, the resulting process will assume the effective user ID given to the owner class. This enables users to be treated temporarily as root (or another user).
 The set group ID, setgid, or SGID permission. When a file with setgid is executed, the resulting process will assume the group ID given to the group class. When setgid is applied to a directory, new files and directories created under that directory will inherit their group from that directory. (Default behaviour is to use the primary group of the effective user when setting the group of new files and directories, except on BSD-derived systems which behave as though the setgid bit is always set on all directories (see Setuid).)
 The sticky mode (also known as the Text mode). The classical behaviour of the sticky bit on executable files has been to encourage the kernel to retain the resulting process image in memory beyond termination; however, such use of the sticky bit is now restricted to only a minority of unix-like operating systems (HP-UX and UnixWare). On a directory, the sticky permission prevents users from renaming, moving or deleting contained files owned by users other than themselves, even if they have write permission to the directory. Only the directory owner and superuser are exempt from this.

These additional modes are also referred to as setuid bit, setgid bit, and sticky bit, due to the fact that they each occupy only one bit.

Notation of traditional Unix permissions

Symbolic notation
Unix permissions are represented either in symbolic notation or in octal notation.

The most common form, as used by the command ls -l, is symbolic notation.

The first character of the ls display indicates the file type and is not related to permissions. The remaining nine characters are in three sets, each representing a class of permissions as three characters. The first set represents the user class. The second set represents the group class. The third  set represents the others class.

Each of the three characters represent the read, write, and execute permissions:
 r if reading is permitted, - if it is not.
 w if writing is permitted, - if it is not.
 x if execution is permitted, - if it is not.

The following are some examples of symbolic notation:
 -rwxr-xr-x: a regular file whose user class has full permissions and whose group and others classes have only the read and execute permissions.
 crw-rw-r--: a character special file whose user and group classes have the read and write permissions and whose others class has only the read permission.
 dr-x------: a directory whose user class has read and execute permissions and whose group and others classes have no permissions.

In some permission systems additional symbols in the ls -l display represent additional permission features:
 + (plus) suffix indicates an access control list that can control additional permissions.
 . (dot) suffix indicates an SELinux context is present.  Details may be listed with the command ls -Z.
 @ suffix indicates extended file attributes are present.

To represent the  setuid, setgid and sticky or text attributes, the executable character (x or -) is modified. Though these attributes affect the overall file, not only users in one class, the setuid attribute modifies the executable character in the triad for the user, the setgid attribute modifies the executable character in the triad for the group and the sticky or text attribute modifies the executable character in the triad for others. For the setuid or setgid attributes, in the first or second triad, the x becomes s and the - becomes S.  For the sticky or text attribute, in the third triad, the x becomes t and the - becomes T. Here is an example:
 -rwsr-Sr-t: a file whose user class has read, write and execute permissions; whose group class has read permission; whose others class has read and execute permissions; and which has setuid, setgid and sticky attributes set.

Numeric notation
Another method for representing Unix permissions is an octal (base-8) notation as shown by stat -c %a. This notation consists of at least three digits. Each of the three rightmost digits represents a different component of the permissions: owner, group, and others.  (If a fourth digit is present, the leftmost (high-order) digit addresses three additional attributes, the setuid bit, the setgid bit and the sticky bit.)

Each of these digits is the sum of its component bits in the binary numeral system. As a result, specific bits add to the sum as it is represented by a numeral:
 The read bit adds 4 to its total (in binary 100),
 The write bit adds 2 to its total (in binary 010), and
 The execute bit adds 1 to its total (in binary 001).
These values never produce ambiguous combinations; each sum represents a specific set of permissions. More technically, this is an octal representation of a bit field – each bit references a separate permission, and grouping 3 bits at a time in octal corresponds to grouping these permissions by user, group, and others.

These are the examples from the symbolic notation section given in octal notation:

User private group
Some systems diverge from the traditional POSIX model of users and groups by creating a new group – a "user private group" – for each user. Assuming that each user is the only member of its user private group, this scheme allows an umask of 002 to be used without allowing other users to write to newly created files in normal directories because such files are assigned to the creating user's private group. However, when sharing files is desirable, the administrator can create a group containing the desired users, create a group-writable directory assigned to the new group, and, most importantly, make the directory setgid. Making it setgid will cause files created in it to be assigned to the same group as the directory and the 002 umask (enabled by using user private groups) will ensure that other members of the group will be able to write to those files.

See also
 Comparison_of_file_systems#Metadata
 chmod: change mode (permissions) on Unix-like file systems
 chattr or chflags: change attributes or flags including those which restrict access.
 lsattr list attributes
 POSIX
 umask
 User identifier (Unix)
 Group identifier (Unix)

References

External links
 The Linux Cookbook: Groups and How to Work in Them by Michael Stutz 2004